Frederick W. Green may refer to:

Frederick W. Green (congressman) (1816–1879), Frederick William Green, U.S. Representative from Ohio
Frederick W. Green (Egyptologist) (1869–1949), Frederick William Green, English Egyptologist
Freddie Green (1911–1987), Frederick William Green, American swing jazz guitarist
Fred W. Green (1871–1936), Frederick Warren Green, American politician, Governor of Michigan

See also

Fred Green (disambiguation)
Frederick Green (disambiguation)